First Security Islami Bank Limited is a public limited bank in Bangladesh which was founded on 29 August 1999 provides sharia compliant banking. Mohammed Saiful Alam, chairman of S. Alam Group of Industries, is the chairman of First Security Islami Bank Limited. The bank experienced a cash crunch in 2022 after proving large unsecured loans.

History
First Security Islami Bank Limited was incorporated on 29 August 1999 as a commercial bank. It started operations on 25 October 1999 with an authorized capital of 1 billion taka.

From 2009 the bank started sharia banking.

Bangladesh Sports Press Association (BSPA) in 2014 awarded the bank best sponsor. The Bank sponsored the National School Hockey Tournament.

The Bank saw profits decline in 2018 along with other listed banks on the Dhaka Stock Exchange.

In September 2021, First Security Islami Bank Limited issued shares to raise its paid up capital. It declared a 10 per cent dividend that year.

On 4 December 2022, Bangladesh High Court ordered Criminal Investigation Department, Bangladesh Financial Intelligence Unit, Bangladesh Bank, and Anti-Corruption Commission to investigate Social Islami Bank Limited, Islami Bank Bangladesh Limited, and First Security Islami Bank Limited. The chairman of S. Alam Group, Mohammed Saiful Alam, is chairman of the First Security Islami Bank Limited while his group controls Social Islami Bank Limited, and Islami Bank Bangladesh Limited. According to Ahsan H Mansur, director of Policy Research Institute of Bangladesh, told The Daily Star that S. Alam Group had taken 800 billion BDT from Banks controlled by S. Alam Group. On 13 December, Bangladesh Bank appointed observers at Islami Bank Bangladesh and First Security Islami Bank. On 29 December, Social Islami Bank Limited, Global Islami Bank, First Security Islami Bank Limited, and Union Bank took loans of 67 billion BDT from Bangladesh Bank in emergency cash infusion. Before them Islamic Bank Bangladesh took 80 billion BDT in emergency loans from Bangladesh Bank. Bangladesh Bank imposed restricts on the five banks providing major loans. S. Alam Group filed a Digital Security Act case against an executive of Golden Life Insurance who posted posters and social media posts accusing the group of embezzling money from their own banks including First Security Islami Bank Limited.

Charity
The bank provides scholarships for meritorious students through its corporate social responsibility. The bank has established a charity hospital and school.

Subsidiaries 
 First Security Islami Capital and Investment Limited

References

External links

 Company Overview of First Security Islami Bank Limited
 RIGHTS SHARE OFFER DOCUMENT
 Dhaka Stock Exchange

Banks of Bangladesh
Banks established in 1999
Islamic banks of Bangladesh
1999 establishments in Bangladesh